Turkmenistan – United States relations are bilateral relations between Turkmenistan and the United States.

History 

For several years, Turkmenistan was a key player in the U.S. Caspian Basin Energy Initiative, which sought to facilitate negotiations between commercial partners and the Governments of Turkmenistan, Georgia, Azerbaijan, and Turkey to build a pipeline under the Caspian Sea and export Turkmen gas to the Turkish domestic energy market and beyond—the so-called Trans-Caspian Gas Pipeline (TCGP). However, the Government of Turkmenistan essentially removed itself from the negotiations in 2000 by refusing all offers by its commercial partners and making unrealistic demands for billion-dollar "pre-financing." Following a tripartite summit with the presidents of Russia and Kazakhstan in May 2007 in which gas was a major topic, however, the new President Berdimuhamedow resurrected the idea of a Trans-Caspian gas pipeline, explicitly refusing to rule out the possibility of constructing such a pipeline in the future.

The United States and Turkmenistan continue to disagree about the latter state's path toward democratic and economic reform. The United States has publicly advocated industrial privatization, market liberalization, and fiscal reform, as well as legal and regulatory reforms to open up the economy to foreign trade and investment, as the best way to achieve prosperity, true independence and sovereignty.

The U.S. Embassy and offices of USAID and the Peace Corps are located in Ashgabat, Turkmenistan.

See also 
 Foreign relations of Turkmenistan
 Foreign relations of the United States
 List of ambassadors of Turkmenistan to the United States

References

External links
History of Turkmenistan - U.S. relations

 
Bilateral relations of the United States
United States